Daniel Danielopolu (12 April 1884 – 29 April 1955) was a Romanian physiologist, clinician and pharmacologist. In 1938, he was elected an honorary member of the Romanian Academy.

Notes

Honorary members of the Romanian Academy
Rectors of the University of Bucharest
Academic staff of the University of Bucharest
1884 births
1955 deaths
Members of the Romanian Academy of Sciences
Romanian Ministers of Health
Physicians from Bucharest